Tibor Szabó (born 12 March 1977) is a Serbian-born Hungarian football midfielder.

Career
After starting playing in Serbia still young, he moved in 1997 to Hungary where he played for Debreceni VSC, Diósgyőri VTK, Budapest Honvéd, Ferencvárosi TC, Videoton FC, Lombard-Pápa and Sopron. In between, he played half a season in a Russian Second league club FC Volgar Astrakhan. He also played in Poland, in Dyskobolia Grodzisk Wielkopolski, and in Greece, first in PAS Giannina, and last in Panetolikos.

References

External links
 
 Szabó Tibor NBI stats at nela.hu

1977 births
Living people
Sportspeople from Sombor
Hungarians in Vojvodina
Hungarian footballers
Association football midfielders
Nemzeti Bajnokság I players
Ekstraklasa players
FK Vojvodina players
FK Cement Beočin players
FK Partizan players
FK Teleoptik players
Debreceni VSC players
Diósgyőri VTK players
Budapest Honvéd FC players
Ferencvárosi TC footballers
Fehérvár FC players
Lombard-Pápa TFC footballers
Obra Kościan players
Soproni FAC footballers
Dyskobolia Grodzisk Wielkopolski players
Expatriate footballers in Poland
Hungarian expatriate sportspeople in Poland
FC Volgar Astrakhan players
Expatriate footballers in Russia
PAS Giannina F.C. players
Panetolikos F.C. players
Expatriate footballers in Greece
Serbian emigrants to Hungary
Hungarian expatriate sportspeople in Greece
Hungarian expatriate sportspeople in Russia
Serbian footballers